Licheng (Min Nan Pe̍h-ōe-jī: Lí-siâⁿ-khu) is a district of Quanzhou, Fujian province, People's Republic of China.

Geography 
Licheng District consists of two parts, separated by the Jin River. On the left, northeastern side of the river, Licheng District includes several square kilometers that encompass most of Quanzhou's historical center; this is surrounded on all sides (other than the river) by Fengze District. On the right, southeastern side, Licheng District includes a much larger area, with both urban and suburban parts.

Architecture 
In relation to many other cities in China, Licheng has much of its historic center intact. Licheng's historic center is not the typical Chinese city center, having many European-influenced buildings and churches as well. Considering that it is a coastal port city, this is unsurprising. The unique mix of medieval architecture in the old city and its importance to medieval maritime trade in China led many sites within the district to be inscribed on the UNESCO World Heritage List in 2021.

Cultural Attractions
Most of historical monuments of downtown Quanzhou are within Licheng District.
Kaiyuan Temple
Qingjing Mosque

Administration

The district comprises eight subdistricts:
 Jiangnan
 Fuqiao
 Jinlong
 Changtai
 Kaiyuan
 Lizhong
 Haibin
 Linjiang

There is also one township-level Garden Zone:
Jiangnan Gaoxin

Notes and references

Quanzhou
County-level divisions of Fujian